The Bargain is a 1921 British silent crime film directed by Henry Edwards and starring Edwards, Chrissie White and Rex McDougall. It was based on a play by Edward Irwin.

Cast
 Henry Edwards – Dennis Trevor 
 Chrissie White – Mary 
 Rex McDougall – Dick Wentworth 
 Mary Dibley – Bella Wentworth 
 James Annand – Tamplin 
 John Marlborough East – Lout 
 John MacAndrews – Murphy 
 Henry Vibart – Grosvenor Wentworth

References

External links

1921 films
British silent feature films
1921 crime films
1920s English-language films
Films directed by Henry Edwards
British films based on plays
British black-and-white films
British crime films
Hepworth Pictures films
1920s British films